Bella Creek is a rural locality in the Gympie Region, Queensland, Australia. In the  Bella Creek had a population of 43 people.

History 
Bella Junction Provisional School opened on 28 May 1928 with 13 students. It was built with timber donated by local people and built by local farmer Frank Edward Schellbach. Declining enrolments forced the school to close on 11 July 1932. The school was located at the junction of the Bella Creek and Yabba Creek beside the state forest reserve (at approx ).

In the  Bella Creek had a population of 43 people.

Education 
There are no schools in Bella Junction. The nearest government primary school is Mary Valley State College in neighbouring Imbil to the north-east. The nearest government secondary schools are Mary Valley State College (to Year 10) and Gympie State High School (to Year 12) in Gympie to the north.

References

External links

Gympie Region
Localities in Queensland